The women's 3000 metres steeplechase at the 2012 European Athletics Championships was held at the Helsinki Olympic Stadium on 28 and 30 June.

Medalists

Records

Schedule

Results

Round 1
First 4 in each heat (Q) and 7 best performers (q) advance to the Semifinals.

Final

References

 Round 1 Results
 Final Results
Full results

Steeplechase 3000 W
Steeplechase at the European Athletics Championships
2012 in women's athletics